Morna Dam may refer to following dams in the state of Maharashtra of India:
 Morna Dam, Shirala, on Morna river near Shirala in Sangli district
 Morna Gureghar Dam, on a local river near Patur in Satara district